The Athboy River (also known as the Yellow Ford River) is a river in Athboy, County Meath, Ireland. The river is a tributary of the River Boyne, meeting it near the town of Trim, County Meath.

References 

Rivers of County Meath